Solva pallipes is a species of fly in the family Xylomyidae. It is found throughout most of North America.

Adults are found in shady, wooded areas, often on tree trunks. They have also been found on Chrysanthemum plants, and are attracted to lights. Larvae have been found underneath the bark of cottonwood, Carolina poplar, Osage orange, and red mulberry trees.

References

Xylomyidae
Insects described in 1863
Taxa named by Hermann Loew
Diptera of North America